Shaun Daryl Norris, OAM (born 2 April 1985) is an Australian wheelchair basketball player. He was a member of the Rollers team that competed at the 2020 Summer Paralympics, his fifth Games.

Personal
Norris is from the Perth suburb of Banksia Grove, Western Australia, and was born on  2 April 1985. He became a paraplegic after a car accident.

Basketball
Norris's wheelchair basketball classification is 3.0 ppints, and he is a shooting guard. His ability to play wheelchair basketball has been supported by the Western Australian Institute of Sport Individual Athlete Support Program.

National team
When competing for the national team, Norris wears number 7.

Paralympics

Norris was part of the silver medal-winning Australia men's national wheelchair basketball team at the 2004 Summer Paralympics. He was also part of the gold medal-winning Australia men's national wheelchair basketball team at the 2008 Summer Paralympics, for which he received a Medal of the Order of Australia. 
At the 2012 Summer Paralympics he was part of the Australian men's wheelchair team that won silver.

Norris was chosen to be a part of the team sent to represent Australia at the 2016 Paralympics where they finished sixth.

At the 2020 Tokyo Paralympics, the Rollers finished fifth with a win–loss record of 4–4.

Other competitions
In 2003, he competed at the Kitakyushu Champions Cup in Japan, where his team took first place. In 2004, he was part of the squad that came in first place at the Roosevelt Cup. In 2006, he was named as part of the World All-Star 5 for the 2006 Gold Cup tournament. He was part of the 2007 squad that competed at the Paralympic World Cup. In 2008, he was part of the team that took silver at the Beijing Paralympic test event. In 2009, he was part of the Australian squad that won a gold medal at the IWBF Asia-Oceania Championship. In the final game of the tournament, in a game versus Japan, he had 7 rebounds, 19 points and 2 assists. That year, he also won a gold medal as part of the team that competed at the Paralympic World Cup in Manchester, England. In 2009, he was part of the national side that competed at the Rollers World Challenge. He was a member of the Australia men's national wheelchair basketball team that competed at the 2010 Wheelchair Basketball World Championship that won a gold medal. He and fellow Australian teammate Justin Eveson were recognised for their performance at the tournament by being named as one of the World All-Star Five for the tournament.  He was a member of the Rollers team that won the gold medal at the 2014 Wheelchair Basketball World Championships. In 2016, he was selected for the 2016 Summer Paralympics in Rio de Janeiro.

In 2018, he was a member of the Rollers that won the bronze medal at 2018 Wheelchair Basketball World Championship in Hamburg, Germany.

Club basketball
Norris plays his club basketball for the Perth Wheelcats. In 2002, he played club basketball for the Perth Wheelcats of Australia's National Wheelchair Basketball League.  That year, the team won the league championship, and he was named the Most Valuable Player for the Finals series. In 2007, he was still part of the Wheelcats team, and the  again won the league championships.  That year, he was named the league's MVP and was named as part of the league's All-Star Five.  That same year, the Wheelcats won the World Club Championships.   In 2009, he was again on the roster for the Perth Wheelcats.  His performances helped the team win some games, including a round two victory of the Adelaide Thunder. In 2010, he was playing club basketball with CD Fundosa Grupo. , he plays his club basketball for the Perth Wheelcats. In the first game of the 2011 season against the Wollongong Roller Hawks, he had 16 assists. His Perth Wheelcats lost to the Wollongong Roller Hawks in the 2011 NWBL Championship. He scored 23 points in the semi-final, and 28 points in the preliminary finals. In the finals, he had 15 points, 9 assists and 9 rebounds.

Recognition
In 2010, he was named one of The West Australian ANZ Sports Star Nominees in the wheelchair basketball category. In 2014, he was awarded Wheelchair Sports WA Sports Star of the Year and Be Active Perth Wheelcats MVP. Norris was named International Paralympic Committee Athlete for the Month - November 2019.

References

External links
 
 
 Basketball Australia Profile

Paralympic wheelchair basketball players of Australia
Paralympic gold medalists for Australia
Paralympic silver medalists for Australia
Wheelchair category Paralympic competitors
Wheelchair basketball players at the 2004 Summer Paralympics
Wheelchair basketball players at the 2008 Summer Paralympics
Wheelchair basketball players at the 2012 Summer Paralympics
Wheelchair basketball players at the 2016 Summer Paralympics
Wheelchair basketball players at the 2020 Summer Paralympics
Recipients of the Medal of the Order of Australia
1985 births
Living people
Western Australian Institute of Sport alumni
Medalists at the 2004 Summer Paralympics
Medalists at the 2008 Summer Paralympics
Medalists at the 2012 Summer Paralympics
Paralympic medalists in wheelchair basketball
People with paraplegia